Montague Gold Mines  (located at 44°43'06"N, 63°30'48"W) is a rural community in the Halifax Regional Municipality of Nova Scotia, located on the Montague Road off of exit 14 of Highway 107 three kilometers from Dartmouth.

History
The community grew with the gold mine; however, when the mine closed, the economy was based on lumbering and farming. Today, Montague Gold Mines is a small residential area with easy access to Dartmouth through Highway 107 and Route 318.

In 2018 the Government of Nova Scotia initiated the process of closing the former gold mining site that is heavily contaminated with arsenic and mercury.

References

Explore HRM

Communities in Halifax, Nova Scotia
General Service Areas in Nova Scotia